Gênesis is a Brazilian telenovela produced by RecordTV and Casablanca that aired from 19 January 2021 to 22 November 2021. The series is written by Camilo Pellegrini, Raphaela Castro, and Stephanie Ribeiro. It stars an ensemble cast featuring Zé Carlos Machado, Adriana Garambone, Oscar Magrini, Cássia Linhares, Miguel Coelho, Thaís Melchior, Pablo Morais, Francisca Queiroz, Juliano Laham, Letícia Almeida, Juliana Boller and Carlo Porto. The plot is based on the Book of Genesis.

Premise 
Divided into seven phases, the series dates back to the beginning of humanity and the world and tells the biblical stories of Garden of Eden, Noah's Ark, Tower of Babel, Ur of the Chaldees, Abraham, Jacob, and ending with Joseph of Egypt.

Cast

Garden of Eden 
 Carlo Porto as Adão
 Juliana Boller as Eva
 Igor Rickli as Lúcifer
 Caio Manhente as Abel
 Eduardo Speroni as Cain
 Flávio Galvão as Deus
 Ana Terra Blanco as Renah
 Carolina Oliveira as Kira
 Anna Rita Cerqueira as Tila
 Ranna Bittencourt as Aba
 Fernanda Junqueira as Naira
 Manu Papera as Mairi
 Joana Leite as Zohar
 Júlia Braz as Uma

Noah's Ark 

 Oscar Magrini as Noé
 Bruno Guedes as Young Noé
 Cássia Linhares as Naamá
 Rafaela Sampaio as Young Naamá
 Igor Rickli as Lúcifer
 Augusto Caliman as Sem
 Marjorie Gerardi as Heidi
 Vinícius Redd as Cam
 Clara Niin as Tali
 Gil Coelho as Jafé
 Nicole Rosemberg as Dana
 Leonardo Medeiros as Zeno
 Clemente Viscaíno as Metusalém
 Jayme Periard as Lameque
 Alessandra Verney as Ada
 Carolina Chalita as Zilá
 Iran Malfitano as Tubalcaim
 Fernando Roncato as Jabal
 Sérgio Abreu as Jubal
 Flávio Galvão as Deus
 Stephanie Serrat as Laíza

Tower of Babel 

 Pablo Morais as Ninrode
 Francisca Queiroz as Semíramis
 Pâmela Tomé as Liba
 Giuseppe Oristanio as Gomer
 Igor Rickli as Lúcifer
 Eline Porto as Harete
 Marcelo Galdino as Cuxe
 Adriana Rabelo as Ulia
 Daniel Dalcin as Asquenaz
 Caio Menck as Togarma
 Hugo Carvalho as Pelegue
 Gisela Reimann as Jália
 Duda Balestero as Cilá
 Vicky Valentim as Siméia
 Marcelo Gonçalves as Elisá
 Mariana Gallindo as Zade
 Flávio Galvão as Deus
 Ed Canedo as Sidom
 Saulo Rodrigues as Társis
 Mario Hermeto as Mizraim
 Dudu Azevedo as Jesus

Production 
Filming of the telenovela began in November 2019 in Cambará, Rio Grande do Sul. Production also took place in Ponta Grossa, Diamantina, Itaguaí, and in Ouarzazate, Morocco. On 16 March 2020, it was announced that filming of the telenovela was suspended due to the COVID-19 pandemic. RecordTV was forced to bring back cast members filming in Morocco to Brazil. Because of this, the premiere, which was scheduled for 14 April 2020, had to be postponed by RecordTV. Filming resumed on 19 October 2020 with strict safety protocols. During the suspension it was decided that the telenovela would no longer film in Morocco.

Ratings

References

External links 
 

2021 telenovelas
2021 Brazilian television series debuts
2021 Brazilian television series endings
2020s Brazilian television series
Brazilian telenovelas
RecordTV telenovelas
Portuguese-language telenovelas
Television productions suspended due to the COVID-19 pandemic
Cultural depictions of Isaac